Taussig or Tausig is a surname. Notable people with the surname include:

 Karl Tausig (1841–1871), Polish musician
Don Taussig, American Major League Baseball player
 Edward D. Taussig (1847–1921), American rear admiral
 Frank William Taussig (1859–1940), American economist
 Franziska Tausig (1895–1989), Austrian author
 Frederick J. Taussig (1872-1943), American gynaecologist and obstetrician
 Helen B. Taussig (1898–1986), American cardiologist, daughter of Frank Taussig
 Imre Taussig (1894–1945), Hungarian footballer 
 Isaac W. Taussig (1850–1917), mayor of Jersey City, New Jersey
 Joseph Taussig (1877–1947), American vice admiral, son of Edward Taussig
 Joseph K. Taussig Jr. (1920-1999), American captain, son of Joseph Taussig
 Michael Taussig (born 1940), American anthropologist
 Otto Tausig (1922–2011), Austrian writer, director and actor
 Peter Elyakim Taussig (born 1944), Israeli pianist
 Walter Taussig (1908–2003), American conductor
 William Taussig (1826–1913), St. Louis physician and businessperson, father of F. W. Taussig

See also
 USS Joseph K. Taussig (DE-1030)
 Taussig-Bing syndrome
 Blalock-Taussig shunt

German-language surnames
Jewish surnames